Tiago Manuel Matos Fernandes (born 17 August 1981) is a Portuguese football manager and former player who played as a midfielder.

Playing career
Born in Montijo, Fernandes represented C.D. Montijo, F.C. Barreirense and A.D. Samouquense as a youth. He made his senior debut with G.D. Alcochetense in the 2000–01 season, in Terceira Divisão.

Fernandes never played in any higher than Segunda Divisão B in his career, representing 1º de Maio F.C. Sarilhense, Atlético Clube Alcacerense, Alcochetense (three spells), Vitória F.C. B, C.D. Pinhalnovense, Clube Olímpico do Montijo (two spells) and Juventude F.C. Sarilhense, where he retired in 2015 at the age of 34.

Coaching career
In 2008, Fernandes started working as a scout at U.D. Leiria. He then worked as an assistant of his father at Vitória de Setúbal before joining Sporting CP's youth setup in 2011, initially as an assistant of the under-15s.

In 2013, Fernandes was named manager of the Lions' under-14 squad. He was named in charge of the under-19s in 2015, before being named assistant of José Peseiro in the main squad in July 2018. On 2 November of that year, he was named interim manager after Peseiro was sacked.

On his professional management debut two days later, Fernandes' side won 2–1 at C.D. Santa Clara. He won his only other Primeira Liga game by the same score at home to G.D. Chaves on 11 November, with a goalless UEFA Europa League draw at Arsenal inbetween.

Fernandes returned to his assistant role after the appointment of Marcel Keizer. On 10 December 2018, however, he was named manager of Chaves.

After leaving Chaves on a mutual agreement on 9 March 2019, Fernandes took over G.D. Estoril Praia on 4 June. He was dismissed the following 7 January, after four consecutive defeats.

On 3 July 2020, Fernandes was named at the helm of fellow second division side Leixões S.C. He left the club on 4 October, after five winless matches.

Personal life
Fernandes' father Manuel Fernandes was also a footballer and manager.

References

External links

1981 births
Living people
People from Montijo, Portugal
Portuguese footballers
Association football midfielders
Segunda Divisão players
C.D. Pinhalnovense players
Clube Olímpico do Montijo players
Portuguese football managers
Primeira Liga managers
Liga Portugal 2 managers
Sporting CP managers
G.D. Chaves managers
G.D. Estoril Praia managers
Leixões S.C. managers
Sportspeople from Setúbal District